In linear algebra, a branch of mathematics, a (multiplicative) compound matrix is a matrix whose entries are all minors, of a given size, of another matrix. Compound matrices are closely related to exterior algebras, and their computation appears in a wide array of problems, such as in the analysis of nonlinear time-varying dynamical systems and generalizations of positive systems, cooperative systems and contracting systems.

Definition 

Let  be an  matrix with real or complex entries.

If , then  is the unique  matrix. Otherwise,  has size .

In some applications of compound matrices, the precise ordering of the rows and columns is unimportant.  For this reason, some authors do not specify how the rows and columns are to be ordered.

For example, consider the matrix

and the columns are indexed by

Using absolute value bars to denote determinants, the second compound matrix is

Properties

Let  be a scalar,  be an  matrix, and  be an  matrix. For  a positive integer, let  denote the  identity matrix. Then:

 , a  identity matrix.
 .
 .
 If , then .
 If , then .
 If , then .
 If , then .
 , which is closely related to Cauchy–Binet formula.

Assume in addition that  is a square matrix of size .  Then:

 .
 If  has one of the following properties, then so does :
 Upper triangular,
 Lower triangular,
 Diagonal,
 Orthogonal,
 Unitary,
 Symmetric,
 Hermitian,
 Skew-symmetric,
 Skew-hermitian,
 Positive definite,
 Positive semi-definite,
 Normal.
 (Sylvester–Franke theorem) If , then .

Relation to exterior powers

Give  the standard coordinate basis .

whose basis consists of the formal symbols

where

Suppose that  is an  matrix.  Then  corresponds to a linear transformation

Taking the &hairsp;th exterior power of this linear transformation determines a linear transformation

Taking exterior powers is a functor, which means that

This corresponds to the formula .  It is closely related to, and is a strengthening of, the Cauchy–Binet formula.

Relation to adjugate matrices

Let  be an  matrix.  Recall that its &hairsp;th higher adjugate matrix  is the  matrix whose  entry is

The generalized Laplace expansion formula implies

If  is invertible, then

A concrete consequence of this is Jacobi's formula for the minors of an inverse matrix:

Adjugates can also be expressed in terms of compounds.  Let  denote the sign matrix:

and let  denote the exchange matrix:

Then Jacobi's theorem states that the &hairsp;th higher adjugate matrix is:

It follows immediately from Jacobi's theorem that

Taking adjugates and compounds does not commute.  However, compounds of adjugates can be expressed using adjugates of compounds, and vice versa.  From the identities

and the Sylvester-Franke theorem, we deduce

The same technique leads to an additional identity,

Compound and adjugate matrices appear when computing determinants of linear combinations of matrices.

It is also true that:

This has the immediate consequence

Numerical computation 
In general, the computation of compound matrices is non-effective due to its high complexity. Nonetheless, there are some efficient algorithms available for real matrices with special structure.

Notes

Citations

References
 Gantmacher, F. R. and Krein, M. G., Oscillation Matrices and Kernels and Small Vibrations of Mechanical Systems, Revised Edition. American Mathematical Society, 2002. 

Matrices